The Rosa Parks Museum is located on the Troy University at Montgomery satellite campus, in Montgomery, Alabama. It has information, exhibits, and some artifacts from the 1955 Montgomery bus boycott. This museum is named after civil rights activist Rosa Parks, who is known for refusing to surrender her seat to a white person on a city bus.

Museum 
Inside the museum, there are interactive activities and even a reenactment of what happened on the bus as if you were outside the bus watching. There are artifacts in the museum from the Montgomery Bus Boycott. 

This museum is significant to Montgomery because it exhibits events that had occurred during the civil rights era in Alabama. one of the reasons to build the museum was due to the bus boycott that occurred in Montgomery. It was built in Rosa Parks's honor to educate and tell people of her story. While the actual bus the on which the incident occurred is on display at The Henry Ford Museum in Dearborn, Michigan, there is one on exhibit which is identical to it.

Dedication 
Troy University in Montgomery, Alabama wanted to dedicate their new library and museum to Rosa Parks, "The Mother of the Civil Rights Movement". The library carries her name and it commemorates her refusal to give up her seat on the Montgomery City Bus to a white man. The museum and library were opened on the anniversary of the day she refused to give up her seat: December 1.

For the 65th anniversary of the boycott, two new traveling exhibitions were added. "The Women of the Movement" tells the stories of Jo Ann Robinson, Aurelia Browder, Claudette Colvin, Mary Louise Smith and Lucille Times. "The Legacy of Rosa Parks" includes the museum history and the relevance of nonviolent disobedience today.

See also 
 List of museums focused on African Americans

References

External links

Museums in Montgomery, Alabama
Troy University
History museums in Alabama
Civil rights movement museums
Montgomery bus boycott
African-American museums in Alabama